Zehreela Insaan is a 1974 Indian Hindi-language romance film directed by Puttanna Kanagal and produced by Virendra Sinha. The film stars Rishi Kapoor, Moushumi Chatterjee, Neetu Singh and Pran. It is a remake of Kanagal's own 1972 Kannada film Naagarahaavu which was based on three Kannada novels: Nagarahavu, Ondu Gandu Eradu Hennu and Sarpa Mathsara, all written by T. R. Subba Rao. 

The film did not do well at the box office, but the song O Hansini sung by Kishore Kumar attained popularity.

Plot 

Arjun is an ill-tempered but soft-hearted man. He always falls into in situations that others take him as a bad person. His teacher, who he calls Masterji, is the only person who understands him and appreciates his good qualities, hence Arjun follows his wishes completely. Arjun loves a woman named Aarti and wants to marry her, but Aarti's father opposes this alliance and forcibly marries her off to a man of his choice. Arjun is dejected, but soon finds love in Margaret, his Christian college mate. As time passes, he overcomes Aarti and devotes himself to Margaret. While on a business trip to another city, Arjun finds that Aarti is now a prostitute. Angered and irritated, Arjun finds himself in a pitiable state. Margaret's uncle and mother are against her marrying Arjun. Arjun and Margaret flee to the hills; Masterji catches up with them and tries to pacify Arjun, but he refuses and instead pushes him down the hill to his death. Traumatised due to killing his teacher, Arjun asks Margaret if she will join him where he goes; she says she will, and both jump to their deaths.

Cast 
 Rishi Kapoor as Arjun Singh
 Moushumi Chatterjee as Aarti
 Neetu Singh as Margaret
 Pran as Masterji
 Dara Singh as Pahelwan
 Manorama as Mary
 Dulari as Arjun's mother
 Ratnamala as Mrs. Shyam Lal
 Madan Puri as John
 Iftekhar as Principal Vishamber Nath
 Raj Mehra as Arjun's father
 Sajjan as Shyam Lal
 Asit Sen as Murari Lal
 Paintal as Ranjeet
 Ghanshyam Rohera as Arjun's classmate
 Maruti Rao as Budhram
 Jagdish Raj as Bidre (as Jagdishraj)
 Vijay Kumar
 Nirupa Roy as Shobha
 Ambareesh as Jaleel
 Yogesh Chhabra as Tukaram Phillips

Production 
Zehreela Insaan is a remake of the 1972 Kannada film Naagarahaavu, itself based on three different novels: Nagarahavu, Ondu Gandu Eradu Hennu and Sarpa Mathsara, all written by T. R. Subba Rao. Puttanna Kanagal, who directed the Kannada film, returned to direct the Hindi remake, which was produced by Virendra Sinha under Pragati Chitra International. Cinematography was handled by Sudarshan Nag, and the editing by V. P. Krishna. Ambareesh, who played a character named Jaleel in Naagarahaavu, reprised his role in Zehreela Insaan. While the character of the teacher in Naagarahaavu wore a white dhoti, black coat and Mysore turban, the same character in Zehreela Insaan wore a kurta-pyjama and a Nehru jacket. Much of the film was shot in Chitradurga, with the song "O Hansini" being shot at Chitradurga Fort.

Soundtrack 
The soundtrack was composed by R. D. Burman while the lyrics were written by Majrooh Sultanpuri. The song "Saanp Se Badhke" is based on "Haavina Dwesha" from Naagarahaavu.

Release and reception 
Zehreela Insaan was released on 20 November 1974, and did not succeed commercially. Rishi Kapoor later admitted it was a "mistake", feeling that he should have accepted a film similar to his earlier Bobby (1973) and not something that was "drastically different".

See also 
 Kode Nagu
 Raja Nagam

References

Bibliography

External links 
 

1970s Hindi-language films
1970s romance films
1974 films
Films based on adaptations
Films based on Indian novels
Films based on multiple works
Films directed by Puttanna Kanagal
Films scored by R. D. Burman
Hindi remakes of Kannada films
Hindi-language romance films
Indian romance films